Romoaldo or Romualdo Turini (1752 – 1829) was an Italian painter of the Neoclassic period, mainly active in his native Salò and Brescia.

He was born to a father who was a local printer. Locally, Turini trained under Santo Cattaneo, and ultimately became the latter's biographer. But as a young man, he went to live with his maternal uncle, Ferdinando Bertoni, a well known musician and musical teacher in Venice. There he attended the Academy of Fine Arts. here, he met Antonio Canova, who remained a close friend for life. In 1797, he returned to his hometown. He taught design at the local gymnasium in Salò. In Brescia, he was commissioned to paint some mythologic frescoes for the casa Odassi and the home of the lawyer Zuliani.

References

1752 births
1829 deaths
18th-century Italian painters
Italian male painters
19th-century Italian painters
Painters from Brescia
People from Salò
Neoclassical painters
Italian neoclassical painters
19th-century Italian male artists
18th-century Italian male artists